Modulation is the process of varying one or more properties of a high-frequency periodic waveform.

Modulation, Modulations, Modulate, and Modulator may also refer to:

Economics
 Modulation (European Union), an authorized reduction in direct aid to producers

Science
 Immunomodulation therapy
 Neuromodulation (disambiguation)

Music
 Modulation (music), a change of key
 Modulating subject, a fugue subject which modulates
 Ring modulation, a signal processing function use by synthesizers or effects units
 Modulate (band), UK electronic band
 The Modulations, 1970s American band
 Modulation (music radio program), a weekly music radio program, broadcast via Jefferson Public Radio.
 Modulations A History of Electronic Music by Peter Shapiro, 2000 accompanying book to 1998 documentary

Classical compositions
Modulating Prelude, KV. 624 Mozart
L'art de la modulation F-A. Philidor
Modulation, Johannes Fritsch
Clothes-pin modulation, Ernst Reijseger
Modulationes for 6 voices, Zarlino
Modulations, Jørgen Plaetner
Module Modulations, Carl Ludwig Hübsch (b.1966)
Transcendental Modulations, George Perle

Albums
 Modulations (film), 1998 film and soundtrack album, with 2000 book about the history of electronic music
 Modulate (album), a rock/electronica album by Bob Mould
 Modulator (EP), an electronica EP by Information Society

Other
 Federal Signal Modulator, a civil defense siren